The 1922 National Intercollegiate basketball tournament was the first national championship tournament ever held in intercollegiate basketball. Played  in Indianapolis, Indiana, it attracted six teams, including five conference champions.

Participants included Wabash College, Kalamazoo College, Grove City College (Pennsylvania), S.I.A.A. tournament runner-up Mercer College (Georgia), Illinois Wesleyan and the University of Idaho. The Western Conference and Eastern Intercollegiate League declined invitations to participate.

The following conferences were represented: Pacific Coast Conference (Idaho), Southern Intercollegiate Athletic Association (Mercer), Western Pennsylvania League (Grove City), Illinois Intercollegiate Athletic Conference (Illinois Wesleyan), Michigan Intercollegiate Athletic Association (Kalamazoo) and the Indiana Intercollegiate Athletic Association (Wabash).

Wabash won the championship game  over Kalamazoo;  Wabash finished with a season record of 21–3, winning all three tournament games in convincing fashion.  They were coached by the legendary Robert E. "Pete" Vaughan, and their players were Clyde O Grater, Alonzo Goldsberry, Herbert Crane, Elmer G Roll, Lee N "Pete" Thorn, Ovid M Shelley, Maurice Chadwick, Carl Nurnberger, Paul Schanlaub, Donald Burdette, Reeve S Peare, Fred B Adam. These 12 were the Basketball "W" Men.  Grater was the captain of the Wabash Little Giants with Adam being the captain-elect.  The team averaged 15.08 field goals and 6.12 foul goals per game for the season.  High point man was Goldsberry.

Bracket
March 9–11, 1922, in Indianapolis

References

National Intercollegiate Basketball Tournament, 1922
National Intercollegiate
Postseason college basketball competitions in the United States
College men's basketball competitions in the United States
History of college basketball in the United States
National Intercollegiate Basketball Tournament
Idaho Vandals men's basketball
Mercer Bears men's basketball
National Intercollegiate Basketball Tournament
College sports tournaments in Indiana